Laevipilina theresae is a species of monoplacophoran, a superficially limpet-like marine mollusk. It is known from a live specimen collected in the Eastern Weddell Sea of Antarctica.

References

Monoplacophora
Molluscs described in 2006